Kester Cottages at Founder's Park is a historic site operated by the Pompano Beach Historical Society in Pompano Beach, Broward County, Florida. The site includes a local history museum and exhibits from the late 1930s. They constitute the Pompano Beach Historical Museum.

All were one story and painted white, with shutters decorated with the four symbols (♠♣♥♦) from a deck of cards. The price was $950.

Two cottages were donated to the Pompano Beach Historical Society in 1974. They have been moved from their original locations to Founders Park, and serve as museums of past life in Pompano Beach.

They are open to the public by appointment.

References

External links
3D tour, sponsored by the Historical Society of Pompano Beach

Website
Pompano Historical Society website

Museums in Pompano Beach, Florida
Historical society museums in Florida
Buildings and structures in Pompano Beach, Florida
History of Florida
Pompano Beach, Florida
Historic house museums in Florida
1930s establishments in Florida